Dwaram Bhavanarayana Rao (15 June 1924 – 24 July 2000) was famous Violinist and son of legendary Padmasri Dwaram Venkataswamy Naidu.

He is born to Dwaram Venkataswamy Naidu and Venkata Jaggayyamma on 15 June 1924 at Bapatla. He is married to Gummuluri Varadamma. He was educated in Chennai. He was trained by his father, and the late Prof. P. Sambamurthy.

He has worked as Principal of Maharajah's Government College of Music and Dance at Vizianagaram from 1962 to 1973. He has also worked as Principal of Government Music College at Vijayawada.

He has translated the Brihaddeshi of Matanga Muni, Chaturdandi Prakasika of Pandit Venkatamakhi and Dattilam of Dattila Muni into Telugu language and published it. He was also translated some of the music theory books but they were not in print.

He died of Cardiac arrest at his residence in Visakhapatnam on 24 July 2000. He was 76 years of age and is survived by wife, three sons and two daughters.

Honours
He was the recipient of Andhra Pradesh Sangita Nataka Academy award and Sangita Kalaprapoorna award from Andhra University.

He was a member of the advisory board of the Madras Music Academy.

References

Telugu people
1924 births
2000 deaths
Carnatic instrumentalists
Indian violinists
20th-century violinists
20th-century Indian musicians
People from Guntur district